Southville International School Affiliated with Foreign Universities (SISFU) is a private university located in Las Piñas, in the southern part of Metro Manila, Philippines. It was established in 1998 as Southville Foreign Colleges and is the only provider of Tertiary Transnational Education in the Philippines. The school was founded to provide international curricula and qualifications in the Philippines. It is the only university in the Philippines accredited to offer De Montfort University and Pearson BTEC qualifications.

History
Southville International School Affiliated with Foreign Universities (SISFU) was founded in 1997 by Roger and Helen Bartholomew who teamed up with Southville International School and Colleges (SISC).

In 2018, SISFU introduced the Online Blended Learning program.

In 2019, SISFU expanded its partnership with De Montfort University to offer three undergraduate degree programmes: the Bachelor of Arts in Business Administration and Management (Hons), Bachelor of Arts in Accounting and Business Management (Hons), and the Bachelor of Arts in Entrepreneurship and Innovation (Hons).

Sister schools
Southville International School and Colleges
South Mansfield College
SEED Academy
South SEED LPDH College
Stonyhurst Southville International School

References

External links
 

Universities and colleges in Metro Manila
International schools in Metro Manila
Education in Las Piñas
Educational institutions established in 1990
1990 establishments in the Philippines